The Indian cricket team toured South Africa from 16 December 2010 to 23 January 2011. The tour consisted of three Tests, one Twenty20 International (T20I) and five One Day Internationals (ODIs).

Squads

South Africa's David Wiese was ruled out of the T20I series with a fractured hand and was replaced by Albie Morkel. Rilee Rossouw was ruled out of the ODI series following a stress fracture to his foot and was replaced by Khaya Zondo. Harbhajan Singh was added to India's ODI squad as Ravichandran Ashwin sustained a left side strain injury during the first ODI. JP Duminy was ruled out of the last two ODI matches after suffering a hand injury. He was replaced by Dean Elgar. Duminy is expected to be fit for the Test series. Vernon Philander was ruled out of the last three Test matches after suffering an ankle injury and was replaced by Kyle Abbott. Marchant de Lange was added to South Africa's Test squad as cover for Dale Steyn.

Test Series

1st Test

2nd Test

3rd Test

Krish Mackerdhuj Trophy

Only T20I
The winner of the T20I fixture was awarded the Krish Mackerdhuj Trophy, named in honour of Durban-born Indian-South African cricket administrator Krish Mackerdhuj.

ODI series

1st ODI

2nd ODI

Indian batsman Sachin Tendulkar suffered a hamstring injury during the match and was forced to fly home afterward. Tendulkar's appearance equalled the record number of appearances in ODI matches at 444, tied with Sanath Jayasuriya of Sri Lanka.

3rd ODI

4th ODI

5th ODI

References

South
South
2010-11
2010–11 South African cricket season
2010 in South African cricket
2011 in South African cricket
International cricket competitions in 2010–11